Disco Inferno were an English experimental rock band active in the late 1980s and the 1990s. Initially a trio of guitar, bass, and drums performing in an identifiable post-punk style, the band soon pioneered a dynamic use of digital sampling in addition to standard rock instruments. While commercially unsuccessful during their existence, the band is considered to be a key post-rock act.

History
Disco Inferno formed in 1989 in Essex by teenagers Ian Crause (guitars and vocals), Paul Willmott (bass), Daniel Gish (keyboards) and Rob Whatley (drums), although Gish soon quit the band to join Bark Psychosis, leaving Disco Inferno as a trio. They were initially a post-punk band heavily influenced by bands such as Joy Division and Wire, releasing their first album Open Doors, Closed Windows in July 1991, alongside the "Entertainment" single, also from 1991, and 1992's Science EP, all of which were compiled onto the compilation album In Debt (1992).

However, Crause soon became infatuated with the unique sounds of bands My Bloody Valentine and the Young Gods, as well as the Bomb Squad's hip hop production and sampling on the music of Public Enemy, and with the release of the Summer's Last Sound EP, released later on in 1992 by, the band's musical style changed towards sample-based electronic sounds. The band "hit upon a seemingly simple but ultimately world-opening idea" with the EP: to write their instruments through samplers, and unlike their contemporaries who sampled elements of music, film dialogue or other media, Disco Inferno "engaged with the whole world", using their set up to record sounds ranging from running water, the wind, whistling birds, boots, car crashes and angry voices. Crause had purchased a Roland S-750 sampler with his savings and started programming towards the band's sound for six months. In a 2011 interview, Wilmott recalled of the era:

  

Summer's Last Sound was praised for its uncompromising, innovative and experimental sound, and the group expanded the approach with their subsequent EPs A Rock to Cling To (1992) and The Last Dance (1993), both of which were released on Rough Trade Records after their previous label Cheree closed. According to Andy Kellman of AllMusic, the new label "saved the band's life, as the members believed that they were too challenging for anyone else to understand or care for." Kellman commented that, "disorienting, confusing, and highly schizophrenic, the challenging releases were in direct contrast to the prevailing Britpop scene of the time," taking "A.R. Kane's futurist pop a couple steps further and secured a devout and small following that found solace in their wildly imaginative, peerless nature." The band became characterized as one of the first post-rock bands. Crause and Whatley purchased MIDI-controlled instruments to order the replicate the samples live, with Willmott's bass serving as an anchor to the unpredictable sounds being made.

In a 2011 interview, Crause explained "Most of these other what are now called post-rock groups, I think they regarded us as a kind of tinker-toy group because of the pop songs and the sampling so there was little chance of them deciding to follow us in the sampling - no critical consensus had been built for them to aspire to it - we kind of got ours from Public Enemy, who were too black and the Young Gods, who sang in French, for fuck's sake! And it wasn't seen as 'serious' enough, perhaps meaning it wasn't seen as commercially viable enough... who knows. Anyway, I did it 'cos I had the ideas."

The band's musical approach reached its peak on their second album D. I. Go Pop, released in February 1994. The album's music was harsh and concise, with the melody on the eight tracks often carried by the bassline, while an array of samples (including running water, breaking glass, car crashes and fax machines) built the musical collages. After D. I. Go Pop the band opted for restraint on the Second Language EP, which also featured a new-found optimism in Crause's lyrics. The band's next single, "It's a Kid's World", sampled the drumbeat from Iggy Pop's "Lust for Life" and added in a series of old children's TV themes.

Despite critical acclaim, Disco Inferno attracted little commercial success. Combined artistic and financial pressure began to erode their sense of common purpose and loyalty. The band split acrimoniously in 1995, prior to the release of their final album, Technicolour, which was released in July 1996.

In September 1999, the Tugboat label released The Mixing It Session, which featured six instrumental tracks the band had recorded for radio, while One Little Indian Records reissued D. I. Go Pop and gave Technicolour a belated US release in 2004. In September 2011, One Little Indian released a compilation entitled The 5 EPs, featuring tracks from all five of the now out-of-print EPs released between 1992 and 1994.

Subsequent projects

Ian Crause

After the split, Ian Crause formed Floorshow who recorded some material for an unreleased album which was to be called The Vertical Axis. Some of these songs later appeared on his solo singles in the early 2000s ("Elemental" and "Head Over Heels"), which featured drummer Ritchie Thomas (Dif Juz, The Jesus and Mary Chain). Crause would then spend the best part of a decade away from music and eventually left the UK to move to Bolivia.

Crause returned to music in mid-2012 with a track called "More Earthly Concerns", which resurrected Disco Inferno's sample-heavy textured approach and was released via various blogs. This was followed in November 2012 by "The Song of Phaethon", a long-form single release on Bandcamp inspired by both Greek mythology and British involvement in the Second Gulf War. Several other tracks ("The Vertical Axis", "Suns May Rise", "Black Light", and "A World of Ghosts") were released on Bandcamp in early 2013. Crause's long-delayed debut solo album, The Vertical Axis (also a Bandcamp release) followed in December 2013.

Paul Wilmott

Paul Wilmott formed Transformer, who recorded a cover of Wire's "Outdoor Miner", which appeared on the Wire tribute album, Whore (1996). He would later play in the short-lived London Records-signed trip hop band Lisp.

Discography

Albums
Open Doors, Closed Windows (Ché, July 1991)
D. I. Go Pop (Rough Trade, February 1994)
Technicolour (Rough Trade, July 1996)

Compilations
In Debt (Ché, 1992)
The 5 EPs (One Little Indian, September 2011)

Singles and EPs
"Entertainment"/"Arc in Round" single (Ché, 1991)
Science EP (Ché, 1991)
Summer's Last Sound EP (Cheree Records, October 1992)
A Rock to Cling To EP (Rough Trade, July 1993)
The Last Dance EP (Rough Trade, November 1993)
Second Language EP (Rough Trade, May 1994)
It's a Kid's World EP (Rough Trade, September 1994)
The Mixing It Session EP (Tugboat, September 1999)

References

External links
Disco Inferno on Facebook
Starbound – Flash-based Disco Inferno site

Interview with Ian Crause (in English and Spanish translated version)

English post-punk music groups
English post-rock groups
English experimental rock groups
Musical groups from Essex
Musical groups established in 1989
Musical groups disestablished in 1995
Rocket Girl artists